Darian King and Peter Polansky were the defending champions but chose not to defend their title.

Julian Cash and Henry Patten won the title after defeating Anirudh Chandrasekar and Vijay Sundar Prashanth 6–3, 6–1 in the final.

Seeds

Draw

References

External links
 Main draw

Fairfield Challenger - Doubles
2022 Doubles